Mohammad Samir Yusuf Al-Emlahis a Jordanian football player, who currently plays as an attacking midfielder for Al-Ahli  and Jordan U-23.

International goals

With U-19

None-International

External links 
 

Living people
Jordanian footballers
Jordan youth international footballers
Association football forwards
1993 births
Al-Ahli SC (Amman) players
Al-Baqa'a Club players
Shabab Al-Ordon Club players
Jordanian Pro League players